"Shela" is a song by American hard rock band Aerosmith, the fifth song on the band's 1985 album Done with Mirrors. The songwriting credits are credited to all members of Aerosmith. Both guitarists Joe Perry and Brad Whitford take turns in soloing, with the main riff played by Brad Whitford.

Although "Let the Music Do the Talking" was the first track from the album to be released to United States radio stations (as a promo-only single), "Shela" was the album's first commercially released single in the US, reaching #20 on Billboard's Mainstream Rock Tracks chart in late-1985.

Despite the song being released as a single in the US, a music video was not created for it.

References

Aerosmith songs
1985 singles
Songs written by Joe Perry (musician)
Songs written by Steven Tyler
Songs written by Tom Hamilton (musician)
Songs written by Joey Kramer
Songs written by Brad Whitford
Song recordings produced by Ted Templeman
Geffen Records singles
1985 songs